The 2015–16 Egyptian Handball League was the 60th edition of the Egyptian Handball League, which Zamalek crowned after an absence of five years.

The final stage

Cairo Derby

The first round match of the final stage
date= Sunday 8 November 2015 

The second round match of the final stage
date= Sunday 20 March 2016

Resources

Handball in Egypt